E Sky Mall is a shopping center located in Gushan District, Kaohsiung, Taiwan. The mall was originally expected to open in the summer of 2020, but due to the COVID-19 pandemic, it has been postponed to start trial operation on 20 March 2021, and officially opened on 3 April 2021. Within walking distance from Aozihdi metro station, the mall occupies the lower floors of Kaohsiung Marriott Hotel and is a part of the E SKY LAND (義享天地) complex.

Gallery

See also
List of tourist attractions in Taiwan
Kaohsiung Marriott Hotel

References

External Links

2021 establishments in Taiwan
Shopping malls established in 2021
Shopping malls in Kaohsiung